Roy D. Kurban is a 10th degree American Taekwondo martial arts grandmaster and former Karate national competitor. He lives in Strawn, Texas. Considered to be one of the greatest competitors of all time.

Biography

Roy Kurban began martial arts training in 1965, studying Karate under Allen Steen, Larry Caster, Skipper Mullins, Jerry Wiseman, Phillip Ola, and Dennis Dorris. He also trained in Isshin-ryū Karate with Ed Johnson. He earned his first degree black belt in 1968 in Dallas, Texas. As a member of the United States 8th Army in stationed in Seoul, Korea in 1970, he trained for a full year under Won Chik Park. While there, he took first place in the Yong San All-American TKD Championship in Seoul, Korea.

During the 1970s, he was a formidable competitor, winning 127 national and international competitions, including 80 first-place trophies and grand championships. He was ranked among the top seven U.S. fighters of the decade by Black Belt Magazine. In 1973, Kurban established his own martial school, the American Black Belt Academy, in Arlington, Texas. That same year, he was voted "Best All-around Karate Man in the U.S."  by Professional Karate Magazine. It was during this time that he introduced Jin-Song Chung to the United States, a former champion competitor and instructor whom he had met in South Korea during his Army enlistment. (Chung later opened his own martial arts school in North Dallas and went on to become a grandmaster.)

During the 1980s, he made a name for himself as a peace officer instructor throughout the North Texas region, and established an accredited Taekwondo course for the physical education department of the University of Texas at Arlington in 1982, which is still operational. From 1991 to 2006, Kurban served as Justice of the Peace in North Texas.

He is one of the few Americans to receive a Master Instructor certification from the World Taekwondo Federation. He remains active in the Texas martial arts community, conducting seminars and hosting competitions. He is also an active member of the United States Taekwondo Grandmaster Society (USTGS).

Rank promotions
Kurban earned the following black belts in Karate and Taekwondo:
 1968 — 1st degree in Dallas, Texas
 1970 — 2nd degree at the Jidokwan headquarters in Seoul, Korea
 1972 — 3rd degree in Dallas, Texas from Allen Steen
 1975 — 4th degree in Odessa, Texas from Hee Deok Park, through the Korea Moo Duk Kwan Association
 1980 — 5th degree and Master Instructor Certificate in Fort Worth, Texas from the World Taekwondo Federation, under Grandmaster Won Chik Park
 1986 — 6th degree from the World Taekwondo Federation and Ji Do Kwan Association, under Grandmaster Won Chik Park
 1986 — 6th degree certification in Chung Do Kwan Taekwondo in Arlington, Texas under Larry Caster
 1994 — 7th degree from Grandmaster Won Chik Park through the Ji Do Kwan and World Taekwondo Federation
 2005 — 8th degree and title of "Grandmaster" by Grandmaster Won Chik Park, president of the United States Taekwondo Grandmaster Society (USTGS)
 2014 — 9th degree from Grandmaster Won Chik Park, president of the United States Taekwondo Grandmaster Society (USTGS)

Awards
 Ambassador of Taekwondo Award, 2010, U.S. Taekwondo Grandmasters Society (USTGS)

Published works
 
 
 
 
 , a memoir of Won Chik Park (introduction by Roy D. Kurban).

References

External links
 roydkurban.com, official web site
 Autobiographical information at roydkurban.com
 YouTube.com, videos excerpts of Roy Kurban from New Gladiators

American male taekwondo practitioners
Martial arts school founders
Living people
People from Palo Pinto County, Texas
Year of birth missing (living people)